Praveen Sattaru is an Indo-American film director, screenwriter and producer, known for his works in Telugu cinema. He made his directorial debut with the 2011 film, LBW: Life Before Wedding. In 2014, he directed the critically acclaimed anthology film, Chandamama Kathalu which won the National Film Award for Best Feature Film in Telugu for that year.

Personal life 
Praveen Sattaru was born in Vizianagaram, Andhra Pradesh, India. He holds MS degree in Chip Designing, and has worked as SAP consultant in IBM for about 10 years. He is an Indian immigrant to the United States. He is married to Archana.

Filmography

Television 
It was announced that Praveen Sattaru along with Deva Katta will be directing Baahubali: Before The Beginning for Netflix.

Awards 
 National Film Award for Best Feature Film in Telugu - Chandamama Kathalu - 2015

References 

Living people
American people of Telugu descent
American people of Indian descent
American businesspeople
20th-century births
People from Vizianagaram
Indian emigrants to the United States
Year of birth missing (living people)